Dr. Nino Aquila (died September 2013) was an Italian philatelist who, in 1990, was awarded the Crawford Medal by the Royal Philatelic Society London for his work I francobolli degli ultimi Re: Il servizio postale in Sicilia dal 1° gennaio 1859 all’estate del 1860. Aquila was an expert on the philately of Sicily.

Selected publications
I francobolli degli ultimi Re: Il servizio postale in Sicilia dal 1° gennaio 1859 all’estate del 1860. Italy: Giulio Bolaffi Editore, 1990.

References

External links
FEPA Medal for exceptional philatelic study and research 2009.

Italian philatelists
Philately of Italy
Fellows of the Royal Philatelic Society London
2013 deaths
Year of birth missing